Aconiazide is an anti-tuberculosis medication. It is a prodrug of isoniazide that was developed and studied for its lower toxicity, but it does not appear to be marketed anywhere in the world in 2021.

References

Prodrugs
Carboxylic acids
Hydrazides
4-Pyridyl compounds